AptarGroup, Inc., also known as Aptar, is a United States-based global manufacturer of consumer dispensing packaging and drug delivery devices. The group has manufacturing operations in 18 countries.

History 
The company began as Werner Die & Stamping in Cary, Illinois, in 1946 and later incorporated as AptarGroup in 1992. Aptar originally developed spray valves and pumps for consumer and household products. The company later began producing nasal administration and pulmonary drug delivery devices such as nasal spray systems and metered-dose inhaler valves. Biotech and pharmaceutical companies use Aptar's different Unidose and Bidose devices for the single or two-shot intranasal delivery of different medicines.

In 2016, Aptar announced that it provided the delivery system for Adapt Pharma's Narcan. Narcan is a naloxone hydrochloride nasal spray used as an emergency treatment for opioid overdoses. Aptar's liquid spray drug delivery technology platform works as a ready-to-use, single-shot, unit-dose system for Narcan. It was the first FDA approved nasally administered, ready-to-use medication used to reverse the effects of an opioid overdose. Narcan does not require any assembly, medical training, or needle injection.

In 2016, Aptar entered into an agreement with Becton Dickinson & Company to develop new self-injection devices.

Aptar entered into an agreement in 2016 with Propeller Health Partners to develop a digitally connected medication inhaler. The company made an investment in Propeller Health Partners (now part of Resmed) in 2018. 

In July 2019, the FDA-approved Aptar Pharma's Unidose Powder System as the first intranasally-delivered, needle-free rescue treatment for severe hypoglycemia.

In 2020, during the COVID-19 pandemic, Aptar invested in new tools to accelerate its molding equipment and assembly machines for pumps, but it still wasn't enough to keep up with demand.

Acquisitions 
In 2012, Aptar acquired Stelmi, a manufacturer of elastomer primary packaging components. In 2016, Aptar acquired Mega Airless, a manufacturer of airless packaging solutions. In 2018, Aptar acquired CSP Technologies, a material science company that manufactures active packaging solutions. 

In June 2019, Aptar acquired two companies, Nanopharm and Gateway Analytical. In November 2019, the company acquired Noble International, which specializes in training devices and patient onboarding. In February 2020, Aptar acquired FusionPKG, a makeup packaging company. 

In November 2020, the company acquired the digital respiratory health company Cohero Health.

In July 2021 Aptar acquired the digital therapeutics company, Voluntis (ENXTPA: ALVTX), and 80% of the equity interests of Weihai Hengyu Medical Products Co., Ltd., a Chinese manufacturer of elastomeric and plastic components used in injectable drug delivery.

Sustainability 
Aptar was named to Barron's list of the Top 100 Most Sustainable U.S. Companies in 2019, 2020, 2021, and 2022. At the end of 2020, 85% of the company’s global electricity use came from renewable sources. It was also named by Newsweek as one of America's Most Responsible Companies in 2021, 2022, and 2023 and received an A score for climate change from the Climate Disclosure Project. 

In September 2019, the company announced a partnership with Loop, a shopping platform from TerraCycle that delivers products in reusable containers.

The company has committed to making all of its beauty and home packaging technologies and components reusable, recyclable, or compostable by 2025. In June 2021, Aptar released fully recyclable mono-material pumps, made from materials such as polycarbonates or post-consumer recycled plastic. The company made the Forbes Green Growth 50 List in 2021.

References 

1992 establishments in Illinois
Drug delivery devices
Packaging companies
Manufacturing
Pumps
Sustainable communities
Companies listed on the New York Stock Exchange
Packaging companies of the United States
Manufacturing companies established in 1992
Companies listed on the Nasdaq